Manhatta (1921) is a short documentary film directed by painter Charles Sheeler and photographer Paul Strand.

Production background
Manhatta documents the look of early 20th-century Manhattan. With the city as subject, the film consists of 65 shots sequenced in a loose non-narrative structure, beginning with the Staten Island ferry approaching Manhattan and ending with a sunset view from a skyscraper. It is considered by some to be the first American avant-garde film. The primary objective of the film is to explore the relationship between photography and film; camera movement is kept to a minimum, as is incidental motion within each shot. Each frame provides a view of the city that has been carefully arranged into abstract compositions.

Manhatta was a collaboration between painter/photographer Charles Sheeler and photographer Paul Strand. The intertitles include excerpts from the writings of Walt Whitman.

Preservation status
In 1995 the film was selected for preservation in the National Film Registry by the Library of Congress, being deemed "culturally, historically, or aesthetically significant". Restoration proved difficult, as the negative was lost, and only a single heavily damaged 35mm print remained in existence. It was restored for the DVD set Unseen Cinema in October 2005. The film was completely restored in January 2009 by archivist Bruce Posner, working with film restoration company Lowry Digital. Posner spent close to four years returning the film to its original glory. The Museum of Modern Art and Anthology Film Archives also commissioned a new score from New York composer Donald Sosin.

See also
Experimental film
Rien que les heures (1926)
Berlin: Symphony of a Metropolis (1927)
Man With a Movie Camera (1929)

References

External links

 
 
 
 Unseen Cinema website
Manhatta essay by Daniel Eagan in America's Film Legacy: The Authoritative Guide to the Landmark Movies in the National Film Registry, Bloomsbury Academic, 2010 , pages 76–77. 

1922 films
Documentary films about New York City
United States National Film Registry films
American black-and-white films
American documentary films
1922 documentary films
Black-and-white documentary films
Films set in Manhattan
Articles containing video clips
American silent short films
1920s American films
1920s rediscovered films
Rediscovered American films